"Blue Train" is a 1958 jazz standard composed by John Coltrane. It is the lead track on the album of the same name. Rather than having either a major or minor quality, it contains both by using an E79 chord, utilizing both the major and minor 3rd.

Personnel
John Coltrane- Tenor saxophone
Lee Morgan- Trumpet
Curtis Fuller- Trombone
Kenny Drew- Piano
Paul Chambers- Standup Bass
Philly Joe Jones- Drums

References

1958 songs
1950s jazz standards
Jazz compositions in E-flat minor
Compositions by John Coltrane